Hanru Sirgel (born 8 May 1998) is a South African rugby union player for the  in the Currie Cup. His regular position is flanker.

Sirgel was named in the  side for the 2021 Currie Cup Premier Division. He had previously been named in the  squad for Super Rugby Unlocked and the 2020–21 Currie Cup Premier Division.

References

South African rugby union players
Living people
Rugby union flankers
Griquas (rugby union) players
1998 births
Pumas (Currie Cup) players
Blue Bulls players